Richard Henry McPhail Third (29 September 19275 May 2016) was an Anglican bishop in the Church of England.

Education
Third was educated at Reigate Grammar School, and then Emmanuel College, Cambridge, where he gained a Master of Arts degree, before studying for ordination at Lincoln Theological College.

Ecclesiastical career
He was made a deacon on Trinity Sunday 1952 (8 June), and ordained a priest the following Trinity Sunday (31 May 1953), both times by Bertram Simpson, Bishop of Southwark, at Southwark Cathedral.

He began his ordained ministry as a curate at St Andrew's Mottingham. He was later Vicar of Sheerness, and All Saints, Orpington then the Rural Dean of Orpington, before his ordination to the episcopate as the Bishop of Maidstone in 1976. He was consecrated a bishop on 30 November 1976, by Donald Coggan, Archbishop of Canterbury, at Canterbury Cathedral.

He was translated to be the Bishop of Dover in 1980 (after July) to assist Robert Runcie, the then Archbishop of Canterbury, and was the first Bishop of Dover to hold delegated authority to act as the effective diocesan bishop of the diocese, in the absence of the archbishop.

Retirement
He retired in 1992 to the west of England, but had moved to Edinburgh by the time of his death, and he died there on 5 May 2016.

References

1927 births
People educated at Reigate Grammar School
Alumni of Emmanuel College, Cambridge
Bishops of Maidstone
Bishops of Dover, Kent
Alumni of Lincoln Theological College
2016 deaths
20th-century Church of England bishops